James B. McLeran was a member of the Wisconsin State Assembly. Born in Orange County, Vermont in 1847, McLeran settled in Wisconsin in 1867. He was an insurance agent. Elected in 1886 on the Union Labor ticket, he served only one term.

References

People from Orange County, Vermont
Politicians from Oshkosh, Wisconsin
Businesspeople from Wisconsin
Wisconsin Laborites
Members of the Wisconsin State Assembly
1847 births
Year of death missing